Darwin College may refer to:

 Darwin College, Cambridge
 Darwin College, Kent
 Darwin College (Mauritius)
 Darwin College is a fictional college in the film Horse Feathers